Dawn News is one of Pakistan's 24-hour Urdu news channel.  Based in Karachi, the station is a subsidiary of Pakistan Herald Publications Limited (PHPL), Pakistan's largest English-language media group.

The test transmission of the station occurred on 25 May 2007, and the channel went live on 23 July 2007. Originally broadcast in English, on 15 May 2010, Dawn News converted into an Urdu news channel after successful test transmission of four hours a day. The conversion was mainly due to its financial crisis and thin viewership in the country.

Express 24/7 replaced it as Pakistan's only English news channel briefly, until it too was shut down by Express Media Group for financial reasons.

Dawn News' test transmission was launched by former President of Pakistan, Pervez Musharraf. The complete launch of the channel coincided  with the result of the Supreme Court case which cleared the Chief Justice Iftikhar Muhammad Chaudhry, who had been suspended by General Musharraf.  The channel was initially housed in Haroon House, the head-office of PHPL, but later moved to its current premises in West Wharf, Karachi.

The channel has an online stream available on its website for foreign viewing.

History of the parent organisation
The founder of Pakistan, Quaid-e-Azam Muhammad Ali Jinnah launched the Dawn newspaper in the 1940s - it is the oldest English language newspaper in Pakistan.

DawnNews was launched as Pakistan's first English news and current affairs channel. The channel has bureaux in Karachi, Lahore, Islamabad, Quetta and Peshawar, with studio facilities in Karachi, Lahore and Islamabad.

After a brief test transmission, the channel went live on 23 July 2007.

Keeping in view the public demand, DawnNews had decided to launch a separate Urdu news channel. But before launching the separate channel, it had started a three-hour Urdu transmission within its English channel's airtime, which was later increased to 12 hours. The channel officially put an end to its English language programming on 15 May 2010.

DawnNews has broken a number of big stories. It was DawnNews which exclusively broadcast the footage of the assassin of former Prime Minister Benazir Bhutto. It was DawnNews that got official confirmation from Pakistan that lone surviving gunman of Mumbai terror attacks – Ajmal Kasab – was a Pakistani.

Besides, DawnNews has covered major events including Lal Masjid, Islamabad  operation, lawyers’ movement, military operations in tribal areas and Pakistani general election, 2008. Most of the time, the channel beat its rivals despite limited resources.

DawnNews transmission is watched in all urban areas of Pakistan. It also has access to the rural population, wherever the cable reaches. DawnNews is in agreement with several satellite TV channels, which include BBC World News, Sky News, ABC News and Aljazeera and can be watched in the US, Europe, Middle East and Africa.

Programmes

Current Programming
Chai Toast Aur Host (Seasons 1–5)
Khabar Say Khabar With Nadia Mirza 
Live With Adil Shahzeb
Replay 
Wide Angle
Yes Chef
Zara Hutt Kay

Former Programming

Popular Shows

 30:30
 5 For 5
 9 Do 11
 +92 Identity 
 Awam ki Baat
 Ask Asma
 A Taste Of Fusion
 An Enemy Imagined?
 Apna Gareban
 Aap Ki Kahani  
 Bakhbaar 5
 Bhais Baadal Ke 
 Bol Bol Pakistan
 Bolna Zaroori Hai
 Breakfast at Dawn
 Chai Toast Aur Host
 Chaudhry Ki  Baithak
 Complaint Center
 Cocktail
 Counter Spin
 Corporate Corridor
 Center Point
 Do Raaye
 Doosra Rukh 
 Doosri Kahani
 Dawn News Investigation Cell
 Eye of The Storm
 Equinox
 Fabricate
 Faisla Awam Ka
 Framed
 For The Love Of Food
 Hoshiyaar
 Health First
 I-Techie
 Jaiza 
 Khabrain
 Kab Tak 
 Kaleidoscope
 Life Cycle
 Mano ya Na Mano
 Masla Kya Hai
 Mast Mornings
 Mast Brunch
 Mera Dais
 News Wise
 NewsEye 
 Naeem Bokhari Kay Saath
 No Reservations 
 News Night With Talat  Hussian
 Plan B
 Patrolling 
 Qaum Ka Sense
 Raid
 Reply (sports show)
 Ye Hai Zindagi
 Zakir's Kitchen 
 Open Frequency 
 Street Fighting Years
 Sachai hai Imaan
 Sarkar
 Sawal
 Sawal Say Aagey
 Sport Zone
 Spider
 Spy Master
 Solutions
 Siyasat Dangal
 The First Blast
 The Late Late Show With All Saleem
 The State of Sharia
 The Disposable Ally
 The Bubble
 The Other Story
 The Reham Khan Show
 Target Point
 Talkback
 Take Stock 
 Urban Sketches 
 Wired and Active
 Weekap

Accquired Programming
 Gangs of Bollywood
 Ring A Star
 Saazish
 The Anupam Kher Show
 The Amazing Race
 Zabar Dus

See also
 Dawn
 Dawn Group of Newspapers
 Television in Pakistan
List of news channels in Pakistan

References

 

24-hour television news channels in Pakistan
Television channels and stations established in 2007
Urdu-language television channels
Dawn Media Group
Television stations in Karachi
Television stations in Pakistan